Shine is the fourth album by Mexican alternative rock singer, Elan. The album was released in March 2008. The lead single from this album is a track also entitled Shine and was released in February 2008.

Track listing
 I Love Love
 Still Breathing
 Shine
 Through You
 Looking Back Now
 The Good, the Bad and the Ugly
 Come Over
 Who Called the Police
 It's All Right
 Aeroplane
 Keep Me Up Late

2008 albums
Elán (musician) albums